Judith S. Liebman is an American operations researcher, civil engineer, and mechanical engineer. She is a professor emerita at the University of Illinois at Urbana–Champaign and the former and only female president of the Operations Research Society of America.

Education and career
Liebman was interested in science as a child, and inspired by a biography of Marie Curie. She earned a bachelor's degree in physics from the University of Colorado in 1958. She then worked as an engineer and programmer at Convair Astronautics, General Electric, and the chemistry department of Cornell University (where her husband was pursuing a degree in environmental engineering).

At Cornell, she began taking courses in operations research, and when her husband moved to Johns Hopkins University as a new faculty member she moved with him and began graduate study there. She completed a Ph.D. in operations research and industrial engineering at Johns Hopkins University in 1971. She stayed at Johns Hopkins as an assistant professor of public health administration, operations research, and industrial engineering, but in 1972 she moved to the University of Illinois at Urbana–Champaign with a split appointment in the departments of civil and environmental engineering in mechanical and industrial engineering. Because both Liebman and her husband were joining the University of Illinois faculty at the same time, her appointment required special approval from the president of the university to override the rules then in place against hiring the wife of a male faculty member.

At the time, there was only one other female faculty member in engineering at Illinois, and she became the first female faculty member in civil engineering. In 1977 she earned tenure in the department of mechanical engineering, and moved her appointment to be full-time in that department. She became a full professor in 1984, and retired in 1996. At the University of Illinois, she has also served as Vice-Chancellor for Research and Dean of the Graduate College from 1987 to 1992.

Service
Liebman was a long-term member of the council of the Operations Research Society of America, and served as president of the society in 1987. She was the only female president of the society, before it merged with The Institute of Management Sciences to form the Institute for Operations Research and the Management Sciences (INFORMS) in 1995.

Recognition
In 1996, INFORMS gave Liebman the George E. Kimball Medal.
In 2002, Liebman became one of the inaugural Fellows of INFORMS.

References

Year of birth missing (living people)
Living people
American civil engineers
American mechanical engineers
American women engineers
Operations researchers
University of Colorado alumni
Johns Hopkins University alumni
Johns Hopkins University faculty
University of Illinois Urbana-Champaign faculty
Fellows of the Institute for Operations Research and the Management Sciences
American women academics
21st-century American women